“Sweet Black Angel” (sometimes known as “Black Angel”) is a song by the Rolling Stones, included on their 1972 album Exile on Main St. It was also released on a single as the B-side to "Tumbling Dice" prior to the album. The song features a west Indian rhythm.

Writing and recording
Written by Mick Jagger and Keith Richards, "Sweet Black Angel" is one of the few outright political songs released by the Rolling Stones. Jagger was inspired to write the song after seeing a poster of civil rights activist Angela Davis. At the time, Davis was facing murder charges.

Initial recording took place at Stargroves, Mick Jagger’s home in England during the mid 1970 Sticky Fingers sessions with overdubs and final mixing being completed later at Sunset Sound Studios in Los Angeles between December 1971 and March 1972.

Music and lyrics 
A country-blues ballad with a west Indian rhythm. Jagger is on lead vocals and harmonica, Richards and Mick Taylor on guitars and backing vocals, Bill Wyman on bass and Charlie Watts on drums. Richard “Didymus” Washington plays marimba while producer Jimmy Miller lends support on percussion.

Though Angela Davis is not mentioned by name in the lyrics, the lyrics of the song call "obliquely" for justice for Davis.

Critical reception 
Steve Kurutz writes in his review:

Davis is not mentioned by name in the lyrics:

Live performances
“Sweet Black Angel” was performed live by the Stones only once, in Fort Worth on 24 June 1972.

Personnel

According to authors Philippe Margotin and Jean-Michel Guesdon:

The Rolling Stones
Mick Jagger vocals, harmonica
Keith Richards acoustic guitar, backing vocals
Mick Taylor acoustic guitar (Margotin and Guesdon were uncertain about this)
Bill Wyman bass
Charlie Watts woodblock (Margotin and Guesdon were uncertain about this)

Additional musicians
Jimmy Miller güiro
Richard 'Didymus' Washington percussion

References

The Rolling Stones songs
Songs written by Jagger–Richards
1972 songs
Song recordings produced by Jimmy Miller
Angela Davis
Political songs